Vitaly Mikhaylovich Lisakovich (born 8 February 1998) is a Belarusian professional footballer who plays as a forward for Russian club Rubin Kazan and the Belarus national team.

Club career
On 8 August 2020, Lisakovich signed a four-year contract with Russian Premier League club Lokomotiv Moscow.

On 21 January 2022, he moved to Rubin Kazan and signed a 3.5-year contract.

International career
Lisakovich made his senior international debut on 10 October 2019 in a Euro 2020 qualifier against Estonia. He substituted Yevgeniy Yablonskiy in the 83rd minute.

Career statistics

Club

International

Scores and results list Belarus's goal tally first, score column indicates score after each Lisakovich goal.

Honours
Shakhtyor Soligorsk
Belarusian Premier League: 2020

Lokomotiv Moscow
Russian Cup: 2020–21

Family
His younger brothers Dmitry Lisakovich and Ruslan Lisakovich are also professional footballers.

References

External links 
 
 

1998 births
Footballers from Minsk
Living people
Belarusian footballers
Belarus youth international footballers
Belarus under-21 international footballers
Belarus international footballers
Association football forwards
FC Shakhtyor Soligorsk players
GNK Dinamo Zagreb II players
NK Rudeš players
NK Varaždin players
FC Lokomotiv Moscow players
FC Rubin Kazan players
Russian Premier League players
Croatian Football League players
First Football League (Croatia) players
Russian First League players
Belarusian expatriate footballers
Expatriate footballers in Croatia
Belarusian expatriate sportspeople in Croatia
Expatriate footballers in Russia
Belarusian expatriate sportspeople in Russia